"Way Down Deep" is a song written by Max D. Barnes and Max T. Barnes, and recorded by American country music artist Vern Gosdin.  It was released in June 1983 as the second single from the album If You're Gonna Do Me Wrong (Do It Right).  The song reached #5 on the Billboard Hot Country Singles & Tracks chart.

Chart performance

References

1983 singles
1983 songs
Vern Gosdin songs
Songs written by Max D. Barnes
Songs written by Max T. Barnes